Panjapor Tevi  is a 1972 Cambodian film adapted from the Chinese tale Sophik Eng Tai. The film is directed by Chea Nuk and stars Kong Som Eun and Vichara Dany.

Soundtrack

References 
 

1972 films
Khmer-language films
Cambodian drama films